Kasavalanadu Pudur is a village in the Thanjavur taluk of Thanjavur district(614904), Tamil Nadu, India.
  Agriculture is the main source of the village. The village is located 13 km towards south from Thanjavur.
  In this village every year people of village celebrates the Allah festival (Muharram).
  High school, Library, Govt hospital (PHC), Grama sevai Mariyam, Temples, Small hotels are available in this village

Demographics 

As per the 2001 census, Pudur had a total population of 4495 with 2221 males and 2274 females. The sex ratio was 1024. The literacy rate was 67.65.

References 

 

Villages in Thanjavur district